The Great Wall King Kong Cannon is a range of full-size pick-ups manufactured in China by the Chinese manufacturer Great Wall Motors under the Cannon or Poer pickup series since 2021.

Overview

The Great Wall King Kong Cannon debuted in November, 2021 during the 2021 Auto Guangzhou. I was first previewed as a concept called the GWM X-Pao or GWM X Cannon in Auto Shanghai 2021. Available as a regular version and a long bed version, the Max load capacity of the Great Wall King Kong Cannon is 500 kilograms.
The Great Wall King Kong Cannon shares the same power plant as the GWM Cannon, which is a 2.0-litre petrol and 2.0-litre diesel engines. The petrol engine produces 140kW (197 hp), and the diesel engine is available with either 110kW or 120kW (165 hp).

References

External links

Official website

King Kong Cannon
Pickup trucks
All-wheel-drive vehicles
Rear-wheel-drive vehicles
Cars introduced in 2021
Trucks of China
Cars of China